The  House of Mengüjek (Modern Turkish: Mengüçoğulları, Mengücek Beyliği or Mengüçlü Beyliği; the reigning dynasty is known as Mengujekids or Menkujakids) was an Anatolian beylik of the first period, founded after the Battle of Manzikert. The Mengujekids ruled the regions of Erzincan, Kemah, Şebinkarahisar and Divriği in Eastern Anatolia in the 12th and 13th centuries.

Mengüjek Gazi
Little is known about the founder Mengüjek Ghazi. He was probably one of the commanders of the Great Seljuk, and his principality seems to have been founded in the years following the battle. The beylik was split into the Erzincan and Divriği branches after the death of Emir İshak in 1142. By 1178, Behramşah, of the Erzincan branch, had proved their alliegance to the Rum Seljuks through marriage. While the Divriği branch under Şahinşah, recognized the Sultanate of Rum as their overlords by declaring it on their copper coins.

The Erzincan branch was subjugated by the Sultanate of Rum in 1228, and the Divriği branch was ended by the Ilkhanate in 1277.

Divriği Great Mosque
The Mengüjek dynasty is remembered primarily for its monuments in Divriği. The Divriği Great Mosque was built in 1228 by Ahmed Shah. The adjoining medical center, or Darüşşifa, was built in the same year by Turan Melik, daughter of the Mengüjek ruler of Erzincan, Fahreddin Behram Shah. Both buildings are on UNESCO's World Heritage List.

Rulers
 Mengüjek Gazi (1072-1118)
 İshak (1118-1142)

Branch of Erzincan

 Davudşah (1142-1162)
 Süleymanşah (1151-1162)
 Fahrettin Behramşah (1162-1225)
 Alaeddin Davudşah II (1225-1228)

Branch of Divriği

 Süleyman (1142-1162)
 Şahinşah (1162-1198)
 Süleyman II (1198-1227)
 Ahmetşah (1227-1251)
 Melik Salih (1251-1277)

See also
 Divriği Great Mosque
 Battle of Malazgirt
 Anatolian beyliks
 List of Sunni Muslim dynasties

References

External links

Sources

Anatolian beyliks
History of Erzincan Province
History of Sivas Province
History of Giresun Province
States and territories established in 1072
Sunni dynasties